Michael O'Halloran may refer to:

Politicians
 Mick O'Halloran (1893–1960), Australian Labor Party (ALP) politician
 Michael O'Halloran (British politician) (1933–1999), British Member of Parliament for Islington North, London, 1969–1983
 Michael O'Halloran (Lord Mayor of Dublin) (born 1937), trade unionist and Lord Mayor of Dublin 1984–1985

Sportspeople
 Michael O'Halloran (Clare hurler) (born 1971), Irish hurler
 Michael O'Halloran (Cork hurler) (born 1997), Irish hurler
 Michael O'Halloran (footballer) (born 1991), Scottish footballer (Bolton Wanderers, St Johnstone, Rangers)

Fiction
 Michael O'Halloran (novel), a novel by Gene Stratton-Porter
 Michael O'Halloran (1923 film), a 1923 American silent drama film, based the novel
 Michael O'Halloran (1937 film), a 1937 American drama film, based the novel
 Michael O'Halloran (1948 film), a 1948 American drama film, based the novel

Ohalloran, Michael